Hugo Jaeger (18 January 1900 – 1 January 1970) was the former personal photographer of Adolf Hitler. He travelled with Hitler in the years leading up to and throughout World War II and took around 2,000 colour photographs of the German dictator and various events connected with criminal policy of Nazi Germany during the Spanish Civil War and the Second World War for example the invasion of Poland, Polish soldiers resting after the lost battle against Germans, destruction of Warsaw and persecution of Jews by the German Nazis in Kutno during the Holocaust and infamous Warsaw Ghetto where people were just prisoners in the heart of the modern city during the Holocaust. Jaeger was one of the few photographers who were using color photography techniques at the time, especially Agfacolor invented in 1936.

Early life
Hugo Jaeger was born on 18 January 1900.

Career
Jaeger began photographing Hitler in 1936 and was doing so until the Second World War ended in 1945. Jaeger also specialised in taking color photographs of the Nazi propaganda spectacles, unlike Hitler's other personal photographer Heinrich Hoffmann. As the war was drawing to a close in 1945, Jaeger hid the photographs in a leather suitcase. He then encountered American soldiers prompting fears of potential arrest and prosecution for carrying around so many images of such a wanted man. When the soldiers opened the case however, their attention was distracted by a bottle of cognac they found there, which they opened and shared with Jaeger.

Jaeger buried the photographs inside 12 glass jars outside Munich. The photographer returned to the burial place over several years to ensure they were safe. He dug up all of the photographs ten years later in 1955, and stored them in a bank vault. In 1965, Jaeger sold them to Life magazine.

Death and legacy
Jaeger died on 1 January 1970.

Life.com published the photographs as the 65th anniversary of D-Day beckoned in June 2009. The website published the photographs in four separate galleries online. One photo showed Hitler saluting German troops in Adolf Hitler Platz on 1 September 1938. Another showed the Nazi leader attending a Christmas Party in 1941. Further photos show Hitler at the International Auto Exhibition held in Berlin in 1939 and Hitler on a cruise that same year.

References

External links
 All the pictures taken by Hugo Jaeger in LIFE
 Color photos from Poland during German occupation by Hugo Jaeger
 Hitler, His Inner Circle and Assorted Hangers-On: Color Photos in LIFE
 A Brutal Pageantry: The Third Reich’s Myth-Making Machinery, in Color in LIFE
 Adoring Hitler: Color Photos of a Tyrant Among the Crowds in LIFE
 Photos from a Nazi Christmas party in LIFE
 Top 20 color photos of Hugo Jaeger

1900 births
1970 deaths
20th-century German photographers
Nazi propagandists